The Kukuruku Hills is a prominent area of dissected highlands in Nigeria. It covers (in the abolished terminology) the Afenmai Division, known until 1957 as Kukuruku Division, as well as parts of Owo and Ekiti Divisions, and of Western Kabba Province.

References

Mountain ranges of Nigeria